Dzhepel is a rural locality (a selo) in Kirkinsky Selsoviet, Magaramkentsky District, Republic of Dagestan, Russia. The population was 1,013 as of 2010. There are 14 streets.

Geography 
Dzhepel is located on the left bank of the Samur River, 15 km southwest of Magaramkent (the district's administrative centre) by road. Khorel and Gilyar are the nearest rural localities.

Nationalities 
Lezgins live there.

References 

Rural localities in Magaramkentsky District